Eatoniella delli is a species of marine gastropod mollusc in the family Eatoniellidae. It was first described by Winston F. Ponder in 1965. It is endemic to the waters of New Zealand.

Taxonomy 

The species was originally identified by the name Eatoniella (Cerostraca) delli, and was named by Ponder after named after Richard Dell.

Description

Eatoniella delli has a small conical dark-purple shell. The animal has colourless tentacles. The species measures 1.24 millimetres by 0.73 millimetres.

Distribution

The species is endemic to New Zealand. The holotype of the species was collected on 21 August 1963 on the Bream Tail at Mangawhai Heads in Northland by Ponder himself, who identified the species living on Corallina seaweeds.

References

Eatoniellidae
Gastropods described in 1965
Gastropods of New Zealand
Endemic fauna of New Zealand
Endemic molluscs of New Zealand
Molluscs of the Pacific Ocean
Taxa named by Winston Ponder